Cichlidogyrus attenboroughi is a species of monopisthocotylean monogeneans in the family Dactylogyridae (or Ancyrocephalidae according to certain classifications). It is a parasite of the gills of the fish Benthochromis horii in Lake Tanganyika.

Etymology

According to Kmentová, Gelnar, Koblmüller & Vanhove, "the species epithet honours the English scientist and broadcaster Sir David Frederick Attenborough, in gratitude for the insights and inspiration he gave to so many people to study and protect nature and biodiversity".

See also
 List of things named after David Attenborough and his works

References

External links
 Nathaniel Scharping, Your Weekly Attenborough: Cichlidogyrus attenboroughi. webpage
 Jonas Van Boxel, Une nouvelle espèce pour le 90e anni-ver-saire de Sir David Attenborough. webpage
 Ema Wiesnerová, eng Jana Doleželová. Parasitologists name new species after Brno and Attenborough.webpage

Dactylogyridae
Animals described in 2016
Fauna of Lake Tanganyika
David Attenborough